Louse Creek is a stream in Aleutians West Census Area, Alaska, in the United States.

Louse Creek was apparently named by the U.S. Army to correspond with their alphabetical system of naming, because it starts with an L.

See also
List of rivers of Alaska

References

Rivers of Aleutians West Census Area, Alaska
Rivers of Alaska
Rivers of Unorganized Borough, Alaska